In geometry, a kisrhombille is a uniform tiling of rhombic faces, divided with a center points into four triangles.

Examples:
 3-6 kisrhombille – Euclidean plane
 3-7 kisrhombille – hyperbolic plane
 3-8 kisrhombille – hyperbolic plane
 4-5 kisrhombille – hyperbolic plane

References 

Uniform tilings
John Horton Conway